The 2012 season was the second year for the Women's League Soccer (WLS). 

For the season, most of the WLS clubs stayed in the Midwestern United States.

Elite Division

Standings

References

3